The Horizons and affiliated group is a parliamentary group of the French National Assembly formed on June 22, 2022, following the 2022 French legislative election. The group is chaired by Laurent Marcangeli, Naïma Moutchou functions as the group's the vice president, and Frédéric Valletoux functions as its spokesperson.

Historical membership

References

National Assembly (France)
Parliamentary groups in France